Rivara is a comune (municipality) in the Metropolitan City of Turin in the Canavese area of the Italian region of Piedmont, located about  north of Turin.

Rivara is first mentioned in a patent signed by the Holy Roman Emperor Henry II in 1014.

The coat of arms of Rivara shows eleven hills and a comet accompanied by the Latin motto 
salubrior hisce montibus aer. The reference to the salubrious mountain air is due to the village hilly location.

Main sights

The village has two castles, the Old Castle and the New Castle. The Old Castle dates from the Middles Ages, and it belonged to the Counts of Valperga. It has kept two towers, one of which is crenellated and features several brick Gothic windows.

The New Castle underwent a lot of refurbishment work over the centuries until 1796, when the House of the Counts of Valperga-Rivara became extinct. The new wing that was added in 1835 transformed the building  into a rectangular building with a centrally positioned tower. The castle acquired its current appearance when  architect Alfredo d'Andrade modified its façade.

References

Cities and towns in Piedmont
Canavese